Pachydactylus affinis, also known as Transvaal gecko or Transvaal thick-toed gecko, is a species of lizard in the family Gekkonidae. It is found in South Africa and Zimbabwe.

References

Pachydactylus
Reptiles of South Africa
Reptiles of Zimbabwe
Reptiles described in 1896
Taxa named by George Albert Boulenger